Kurnool Assembly constituency is a constituency of the Andhra Pradesh Legislative Assembly, India. It is one of 7 constituencies in the Kurnool district.

Abdul Hafeez Khan of Yuvajana Sramika Rythu Congress Party is currently representing the constituency.

Overview
It is part of the Kurnool Lok Sabha constituency along with another six Vidhan Sabha segments, namely, Pattikonda, Kodumur, Yemmiganur, Mantralayam, Adoni and Alur in Kurnool district.

Members of Legislative Assembly

Assembly elections 1952

Assembly Elections 2004

Assembly Elections 2009

Assembly elections 2014

Assembly elections 2019

See also
 List of constituencies of Andhra Pradesh Legislative Assembly

References

Assembly constituencies of Andhra Pradesh